New Zealand competed at the 2011 World Aquatics Championships in Shanghai, China between July 16 and 31, 2011.

Open water swimming

Men

Women

Swimming

New Zealand qualified 12 swimmers.

Men

Women

Synchronised swimming

New Zealand has qualified 2 athletes in synchronised swimming.

Women

Water polo

Women

Team Roster

Carina Harache
Emily Laura Cox – Captain
Kelly Fiona Mason
Danielle Marie Lewis
Amy Bettina Logan
Alexandra Rose Boyd
Ashley Elizabeth Smallfield
Lauren Jane Sieprath
Johanna Helena Theelen
Casie Lauren Bowry
Kirsten Patricia Hudson
Alexandra Jasmine Myles
Brook Ali Millar

Group B

Playoff round

Classification 9–12

Eleventh place game

References

2011 in New Zealand sport
Nations at the 2011 World Aquatics Championships
New Zealand at the World Aquatics Championships